"Karma Police" is a song by the English alternative rock band Radiohead, released on 25 August 1997, as the second single from their third studio album, OK Computer (1997). It reached number one in Iceland and number eight on the UK Singles Chart. In the US, it peaked at number 14 on the US Alternative Songs chart. It was included on Radiohead: The Best Of (2008). The music video, directed by Jonathan Glazer, sees singer Thom Yorke in the back of a car pursuing a man. In 2021, Rolling Stone placed "Karma Police" at position 279 on its ranking of the 500 greatest songs of all time.

Composition
"Karma Police" is in a  time signature and played in standard tuning. The song is in the key of G major. Acoustic guitar and piano are the most prominent instruments.

The song progresses from the intro into a mid-tempo section which alternates between a verse and a chorus. The verse begins with the line "Karma police", and the chorus begins with the line "This is what you'll get". After this section cycles through twice, the song switches into a second section which is based around the line "For a minute there, I lost myself". Yorke's voice is put through a reverb effect and a sliding melodic figure serves as a counterpoint to his vocals. In the final minute, Ed O'Brien distorts his guitar by driving a delay effect to self-oscillation, then lowering the delay rate, creating a "melting" effect.

After Yorke told the producer, Nigel Godrich that he was not happy with the ending, the pair reconstructed it with loops and samples, a technique they developed on later Radiohead albums. Godrich said: "It was the first time we did anything like that. Just us in the studio, and a forerunner of a lot of things to come, good and bad."

Lyrics
The title lyric originates from an inside joke; the members of Radiohead would threaten to call the "karma police" if someone did something bad. Yorke explained that the song was about stress and "having people looking at you in that certain [malicious] way". He said: "It's for someone who has to work for a large company. This is a song against bosses. Fuck the middle management!"

Yorke and Jonny Greenwood emphasised in interviews that the song was humorous and "not entirely serious". The line "He buzzes like a fridge / He's like a detuned radio" refers to distracting, metaphorical background noise that Yorke calls "fridge buzz", one of the themes of OK Computer. "Karma Police" also shares themes of insanity and dissatisfaction with capitalism.

Release
"Karma Police" was released as the second single from OK Computer on 25 August 1997. In the UK, it was released on two CD singles and a 12-inch vinyl single, and reached number eight on the UK Singles Chart. In March 2010, almost 13 years later, "Karma Police" reached number 15 on the Danish Singles Chart. Early versions of "Karma Police" were released on the 2019 compilation MiniDiscs [Hacked].

Critical reception

Steve Huey from AllMusic described "Karma Police" as "haunting, mystifying, and exquisite", labelling it "one of the cornerstones of one of the greatest albums of the '90s". The Daily Record declared it a "superb song". A reviewer from Music Week rated it four out of five, picking it as one of the "standout tracks" from OK Computer. In 2021, Rolling Stone placed "Karma Police" at position 279 on its ranking of the 500 greatest songs of all time.

Music video

The "Karma Police" music video was directed by Jonathan Glazer, who had directed the video for Radiohead's 1996 single "Street Spirit (Fade Out)". The video is shot from the perspective of the driver of a car pursuing a man along a dark road, with Yorke in the back seat. The man falls to his knees and the car reverses, revealing that it is leaking fuel. The man produces matches from his pocket and ignites the trail of fuel. Yorke vanishes and the car is engulfed in flames.

Glazer initially pitched the video concept to the American musician Marilyn Manson for his 1997 single "Long Hard Road Out of Hell"; Manson wanted a video similar to David Lynch's 1997 film Lost Highway, which opens with a shot of a road rushing beneath the camera. After Manson rejected the concept, the video commissioner Dilly Gent recommended it to Radiohead for "Karma Police". According to Manson's collaborator Randy Sosin, after Manson saw the "Karma Police" video, "Manson was like, 'Fuck that.' But, you know, a good idea is a good idea."

Glazer said he wanted to "shoot something very simple ... Where the whole narrative could be contained within a single sentence." The running man was played by Hungarian actor Lajos Kovács. Kovács developed cramp during the running shots, and had to have injections in his leg to keep running; he also badly burnt his thumb during repeated takes lighting the book of matches behind his back.

The video premiered in August 1997. Glazer won MTV's Director of the Year award in 1997 for his work on the "Karma Police" as well as Jamiroquai's "Virtual Insanity". In 2001, Glazer said he regarded the video as a failure, "because I decided to do a very minimalist, subjective use of camera, and tried to do something hypnotic and dramatic from one perspective, and it was very hard to achieve and I feel that I didn't achieve it". He described his video for the 1998 single "Rabbit in Your Headlights", by Yorke and Unkle, as a more successful "partner" to the "Karma Police" video.

Track listings
All songs written by Thom Yorke, Jonny Greenwood, Ed O'Brien, Colin Greenwood and Philip Selway.

 UK CD1 
 "Karma Police" – 4:23
 "Meeting in the Aisle" – 3:08
 "Lull" – 2:28

 UK CD2 
 "Karma Police" – 4:23
 "Climbing Up the Walls" (Zero 7 Mix) – 5:19
 "Climbing Up the Walls" (Fila Brazillia Mix) – 6:24

 UK 12-inch vinyl 
A1. "Karma Police" – 4:23
B1. "Meeting in the Aisle" – 3:08
B2. "Climbing Up the Walls" (Zero 7 Mix) – 5:19

Personnel
 Thom Yorke – lead vocals, acoustic guitar
 Jonny Greenwood – piano, synthesizer
 Colin Greenwood – bass guitar
 Ed O'Brien – electric guitar, backing vocals
 Philip Selway – drums

Charts

Weekly charts

Year-end charts

Certifications

References

Bibliography
 
 
 Osborn, Brad (2013). "Subverting the Verse–Chorus Paradigm: Terminally Climactic Form in Recent Rock Music." Music Theory Spectrum 35, no. 1, pp. 23–47.

External links
 

1997 songs
1997 singles
Music videos directed by Jonathan Glazer
Parlophone singles
Radiohead songs
Song recordings produced by Nigel Godrich
Songs written by Colin Greenwood
Songs written by Ed O'Brien
Songs written by Jonny Greenwood
Songs written by Philip Selway
Songs written by Thom Yorke
Number-one singles in Iceland
Songs about police officers
Songs against capitalism